Musytari-class is a class of Offshore patrol vessel of Royal Malaysian Navy  in service from 1980s to 2006.
It was then handed over to the Malaysian Maritime Enforcement Agency / Malaysia Coast Guard in June 2006 and known as Langkawi-class.

History
The ships was purchased by Royal Malaysian Navy in 1980s and served as an offshore patrol vessels until 2006 before both of the ships handed over to the Malaysia Coast Guard. The armament includes one Bofors 57mm as a primary weapon and two to four 12.7mm machine gun. The ships also equipped with a helicopter deck to operate one medium-sized helicopter.

Ships of the class

The ships are currently active in the Malaysia Coast Guard after being decommissioned from the Royal Malaysian Navy in 2006.

References 

Patrol vessels of Malaysia